Liliana Esther Maturano (born December 15, 1952) known by her stage name Tormenta (English: Storm) is an Argentine singer-songwriter, who began writing songs from the age of 16, and who has toured internationally.

Discography

EPs
 Brindo Por Ti
 Hay Un Sentimiento
 Adios, Dijimos Adios / El Hombre Del Piano

Compilations 
 Por Favor Me Siento Sola Y Otros Grandes Exitos

Singles
 Perdoname, He Sido Una Tonta
 Hay Un Sentimiento
 Yo Quiero Compartir Todo Lo Tuyo
 Si Fuera Como Ayer
 Como Una Paloma Herida

External links 
 
 

1952 births
Living people
Argentine pop singers
20th-century Argentine women singers
Singers from Buenos Aires